Samuel Ďatko (born 24 June 2001) is a Slovak footballer who plays for Železiarne Podbrezová as a right winger.

Club career

FK Železiarne Podbrezová
Ďatko made his professional debut for Železiarne Podbrezová against ViOn Zlaté Moravce on 4 May 2019.

International career
Ďatko was first recognised in Slovak senior national team nomination in November 2022 by Francesco Calzona being listed as an alternate for two friendly fixtures against Montenegro and Marek Hamšík's retirement game against Chile. He remained in the position of an alternate for prospective national team players' training camp in early December.

References

External links
 
 Futbalnet profile 
 

2001 births
Living people
Sportspeople from Brezno
Slovak footballers
Slovakia youth international footballers
Association football midfielders
FK Železiarne Podbrezová players
Slovak Super Liga players
2. Liga (Slovakia) players